Stadion Plovdiv is a multi-purpose stadium in Plovdiv, Bulgaria.  It is currently used mostly for athletics championships.  The stadium holds 55,000.  The stadium was built in 1950.

The stadium initially had a capacity of about 30,000 spectators and had lights. Near the end of the 1980s a substantial renovation and expansion began, but was never finished due to a lack of funding. The stadium's present condition is dire, with no UEFA licence, no lights and only a few games played there (mostly junior teams). It is the only stadium in Bulgaria with two-storey stands. The biggest events held in the stadium were the 1990 Lepa Brena, 1999 Metallica concert and the Athletic World Championship for Juniors in 1990. 

Sports venues in Plovdiv
Football venues in Bulgaria
Multi-purpose stadiums in Bulgaria
Sports venues completed in 1950